The Nederlandsch-Indische Levensverzekerings en Lijfrente Maatschappij (NILLMIJ) was a major Dutch insurance business with substantial operations in the Dutch East Indies and in the Netherlands. After Indonesia became independent, its operations in the country were nationalized like those of other major Dutch financial firms, and formed the basis for today's . The Dutch activities continued and, through multiple mergers, became one of the predecessor entities of Aegon N.V.

History

The Nederlandsch-Indische Levensverzekerings en Lijfrente Maatschappij was founded in 1859 by CFW Wiggers Kerchem, who later worked as President of the Bank of Java. Until 1932 the company was named SA Life Insurance Company NILLMIJ.

The company's success Dutch East Indies was largely due to the interrelationship with the colonial government there and a near monopoly. This came to an end when other insurers were allowed into the colony in 1883. In 1939 the NILLMIJ took over NV Java Hypotheekbank.

In 1952 the Dutch activities were expanded through a merger with the Life Insurance Corporation Arnhem. The company came was led by the mathematician John Engelfriet, who was one of the first to take the initiative to introduce computers. In 1956, the computer business Electrologica formed as a subsidiary of the NILLMIJ, which in 1966 was sold to Philips. In 1969, NILLMIJ merged with another insurance company, the First Dutch, and was renamed Ennia. In 1983 Ennia in turn merged with Dutch insurer AGO to form Aegon.

The NILLMIJ built architecturally significant buildings for its offices in the Dutch East Indies, several of which stood long after the company left, for example in Jakarta, Semarang and Bandung.

Gallery

See also
 Bank of Java
 Nederlandsch-Indische Escompto Maatschappij

Sources
1859 - 1959 Netherlands before a hundred years. Commemorative book published on the occasion of the centenary of the Nillmij. Compiled by Prof. Dr. W. Jappe Alberts and Dr. Jonkvrouwe JM Winter. Published in 1959. Reprinted in 1962.
To Know Nillmij / Netherlands Indies Life insurance and Annuity Company (Nillmij) issued in Amsterdam circa 1940 by De Bussy.
BPA Gales, Working on security, a look back over the shoulder of AEGON two centuries of insurance history, AEGON Insurance in 1986.

References

Financial services companies established in 1859
Defunct companies of the Dutch East Indies
Insurance companies of Indonesia
Insurance companies of the Netherlands